Azaddeh or Azad Deh may refer to:

 Azaddeh, Qazvin
 Azad Deh, Razavi Khorasan